Basly is a commune in the Calvados department in the Normandy region of north-western France.

The inhabitants of the commune are known as Basliens or Basliennes.

Geography
Basly is located some 6 km south-east of Courseulles-sur-Mer and 10 km north-west of Caen. Access to the commune is by the D79 road from Bény-sur-Mer in the north-east which passes through the village and continues south-east to Colomby-sur-Thaon. The D83 comes from Douvres-la-Délivrande in the north-east through the village then south-west to Thaon. The D404 passes through the north-east corner of the commune and the D141 from Fontaine-Henry to Colomby-sur-Thaon passes through the south-west corner. The commune is entirely farmland.

The Mue river forms the border of the south-western corner of the commune as it twists around then flows north-west to join the Seulles at Reviers.

History
At a place called Campagne in the commune (near the Moto-Club) many archaeological remains have been found. This is on a spur blocked by the valley of the Mue. The most famous remains are those of a habitat from the first Iron Age (the Hallstatt culture) with an associated rectangular necropolis. There is archaeological evidence of a Neolithic stockade in medieval times.

Basly appears as Basly on the 1750 Cassini Map and the same on the 1790 version.

Administration

List of Successive Mayors

The Municipal Council is composed of 15 members including the Mayor and 4 deputies.

Demography
In 2017 the commune had 1,105 inhabitants.

Culture and heritage

Religious heritage

The Church of Saint Georges Bell Tower (12th century) is registered as an historical monument.

Festivals and events

Sports
The Football Club of Basly has two soccer teams in district divisions.
The Moto Club'' was created in 1977 and has a motocross circuit and a driving school.

Notable people linked to the commune
 Déodat de Basly''' (1862 at Basly - 1937), religious and Franciscan theologian.

See also
Communes of the Calvados department

References

External links
 Basly on the Community of communes website 

Communes of Calvados (department)